The National War Labor Board (NWLB) was an agency of the United States government established on April 8, 1918 to mediate labor disputes during World War I.

History 
The board was appointed by President Woodrow Wilson.  It was composed of twelve members, including five representatives each from business and the American Federation of Labor (AFL), as well as co-chairs Frank P. Walsh and former president William Howard Taft.

The decisions of the NWLB generally supported and strengthened the position of labor.  Although it opposed the disruption of war production by strikes, it supported an eight-hour day for workers, equal pay for women, and the right to organize unions and bargain collectively.  Although the NWLB had no coercive enforcement power, Wilson generally ensured compliance with its decisions.

In general, the relative strength of organized labor in America grew substantially during the war.  Union membership almost doubled after the formation of the NWLB.  Of note, membership in the AFL rose from two million in 1916 to over three million in 1919.  By the end of the decade, fifteen percent of the nonagricultural work force was unionized.

In all, the board ruled on 1,245 cases.  Almost ninety percent of them sprang from worker complaints, and five skilled trades accounted for 45 percent. Of the cases, 591 were dismissed, 315 were referred to other federal labor agencies, and 520 resulted in formal awards or findings.  In reaching decisions, the board was aided by an office and investigative staff of 250 people.  Approximately seven hundred thousand workers in one thousand establishments were directly affected.

The board was disbanded on May 31, 1919, some six and a half months after the end of the war.

Membership 

The twelve members of the board were:
William Howard Taft
Frank P. Walsh, first head of the Commission on Industrial Relations
Frank Hayes, president of the United Mine Workers
Thomas Savage of the International Association of Machinists, now the International Association of Machinists and Aerospace Workers
William Hutcheson, leader of the United Brotherhood of Carpenters and Joiners of America
Victor Olander of the International Seamen's Union
Thomas A. Rickert, president of the United Garment Workers of America
L. F. Loree, president of the Delaware and Hudson Railway
C. Edwin Michael, former official of the National Association of Manufacturers
Loyall A. Osborne, vice president of Westinghouse
W. H. van Dervoort, an East Moline, Illinois manufacturer
B. L. T. Worden, head of the Electric Boat Company

Following the resignation of Walsh as one of the co-chairs, he was replaced by his assistant Basil M. Manly.

See also

 War Labor Policies Board (1918–1919)
 National War Labor Board (1942–1945)

Footnotes

Further reading

 Valerie Jean Conner, The National War Labor Board: Stability, Social Justice, and the Voluntary State in World War I. Chapel Hill, NC: University of North Carolina Press, 2011.
 Richard B. Gregg, "The National War Labor Board," Harvard Law Review, vol. 33, no. 1 (Nov. 1919), pp. 39–63. In JSTOR

External links 
 Papers of the National War Labor Board, 1918–1919 at Cornell University ILR Library Kheel Center 
 Records of the National War Labor Board (World War I)
 Robert Cassanello, "National War Labor Board", St. James Encyclopedia of Labor History Worldwide: Major Events in Labor History and Their Impact, 2003, as hosted at Encyclopedia.com

Government agencies established in 1918
1918 establishments in the United States
1919 disestablishments in the United States
Labor relations boards
Defunct independent agencies of the United States government
History of labor relations in the United States
Agencies of the United States government during World War I